Ahmad Momenzadeh (born 1975 in Isfahan, Iran) is an Iranian football player who mostly played at the highest level of the Iranian Football Leagues. He last time played for Van Pars Naghe Jahan Isfahan. 

He previously played for Esteghlal F.C. which became Azadegan League Champions in the 2000–01 season. and Saipa F.C. which became IPL Champions in the 2006–07 season.

In early 2013 After 2 years absent form football He joined Azadegan League side Parseh alongside his former teammate at Esteghlal Parviz Boroumand.

Club career statistics

 Assist Goals

Honours

Club
Iranian League
Winner: 3
2000/01 with Esteghlal
2004/05 with Foolad
2006/07 with Saipa
Hazfi Cup

Winner: 1
2001/02 with Esteghlal

References
Profile at Iranproleague.net

Iranian footballers
Association football forwards
Persian Gulf Pro League players
Azadegan League players
Sepahan S.C. footballers
Esteghlal F.C. players
Saipa F.C. players
Payam Mashhad players
Foolad FC players
Sportspeople from Isfahan
1975 births
Living people
Aluminium Hormozgan F.C. players